Hajradinović is a Bosnian surname, derived from Arabic Khair ad-Din meaning "the goodness of the Faith". It may refer to:

Haris Hajradinović, footballer
Elvis Hajradinović, footballer

See also
Haradinaj, Albanian variant

Bosnian surnames